Moyo may refer to:

Geography
 Moyo Island, Indonesia
 Moyo River, Sumbawa, Indonesia
 Moyo District, Uganda
 Moyo Town, Uganda

People
 Dambisa Moyo (born 1969), Zambian economist and author
 David Moyo (born 1994), Zimbabwean-English footballer
 Elson Moyo, once deputy commander of the Air Force of Zimbabwe
 Eric Moyo (born 1982), Zimbabwean singer
 Gorden Moyo, Zimbabwean politician
 Henry Moyo (athlete) (born 1972), Malawian Olympic long-distance runner
 Henry Moyo (football) (1946–2012), Malawian footballer, coach, and manager
 Jason Moyo (1927–1977), Zimbabwean revolutionary
 Jonathan Moyo (born 1957), Zimbabwean politician
 Leo "K'millian" Moyo, Zambian R&B hip hop artist
 Lovemore Moyo (born 1965), Zimbabwean politician
 Masasa Moyo, (born 1970) Canadian actress and voice actress
 Mavis Moyo (born 1929), Zimbabwean broadcaster
 Moses ka Moyo (1977-2018), journalist and activist in South Africa
 Peter Moyo (born 1988), Zimbabwean footballer
 Samukeliso Moyo (born 1974), Zimbabwean long-distance runner
 Seiso Moyo (1956–2012), Zimbabwean politician
 Sikhulile Moyo, Zimbabwean virologist 
 Tongai Moyo (1968–2011), Zimbabwean musician
 Yven Moyo (born 1992), French-Congolese footballer
 Mohammad Yousuf (cricketer, born 1974) (born 1974), Pakistani cricketer
 Big Moe (1974–2007), American rapper, nicknamed MoYo
 Sipho Moyo (born 1981), Zimbabwean economist

Fictional characters
 Moyo Makadi, a recurring character in the Belgian series wtFOCK.

Terms and meanings in other languages
 Mojo (African American culture) (or moyo), an early 20th-century African-American term meaning a magic charm or talisman
 Moyo drum, a type of steel tongue drum
 Moyo (Go), a term in the board game Go

See also
Moio (disambiguation)

Zimbabwean surnames
Malawian surnames